The Copa Chile-Digeder 1991 was the 21st edition of the Chilean Cup tournament. The competition started on March 2, 1991, and concluded on November 13, 1991. Universidad Católica won the competition for their third time, beating Cobreloa 1-0 on the final. 
The points system used in the first round of the tournament was; 2 points for the winner; and, in case of a tie, each team took 1 point.

Calendar

Group Round

Group 1

Group 2

Group 3

Group 4

Group 5

Group 6

Round of 16

|}

Quarterfinals

|}

Semifinals

Final

Top goalscorer
Gustavo De Luca (O'Higgins) 12 goals

See also
 1991 Campeonato Nacional
 Primera B

References
Revista Minuto 90, (Santiago, Chile) March–November 1991 (scores & information)
RSSSF

Copa Chile
Chile
1991